The 1996–97 Belgian Hockey League season was the 77th season of the Belgian Hockey League, the top level of ice hockey in Belgium. Six teams participated in the league, and HYC Herentals won the championship.

Regular season

Playoffs

Semifinals 
 HYC Herentals - IHC Leuven 11:9/5:1
 Cercle des Patineurs Liégeois - Griffoens Geel 6:7/4:10

3rd place 
 Cercle des Patineurs Liégeois - IHC Leuven 6:6/6:19

Final 
 HYC Herentals - Griffoens Geel 14:3/3:1

References
Season on hockeyarchives.info

Belgian Hockey League
Belgian Hockey League seasons
Bel